Operadora Ferroviaria Sociedad del Estado (SOFSE), trading as Trenes Argentinos Operaciones, is an Argentine state-owned company created in 2008 to operate passenger services in Argentina. It is a subsidiary of Trenes Argentinos.

Since March 2015 SOFSE has run the Buenos Aires commuter rail services Mitre, San Martín, Roca and Belgrano Sur lines previously operated by private companies.

History

Background
After the Railway privatisation in Argentina at the beginning of the 1990s the railway assets that had not given in concession were taken over by Ferrocarriles Argentinos before being dissolved.

From 1996 to 2000 those assets were administered by "Ente Nacional de Administración de Bienes Ferroviarios" (ENABIEF) created through a National Decree promulgated by the Presidency of Argentina. On June 1, 2000, ENABIEF merged to Dirección Nacional de Bienes del Estado.

From then on, the "Organismo Nacional de Administración de Bienes" (ONABE) began its activities as an organisation created to manage the assets not directly affected by State activities.

Law 26.352 promulgated in 2008 re-organized the railway operations in Argentina creating two State organisations, the "Administración de Infraestructuras Ferroviarias" (ADIF) and the "Operadora Ferroviaria" (SOFSE). Decree N° 752/08 regulated the activities by the recently established company since then.

Further operations

Although having been established in 2008, SOFSE became active two years later, when the organisation took over the railway services in Chaco Province left by Servicios Ferroviarios del Chaco (SEFECHA). In 2011 the organisation added the regional services of Salta and Buenos Aires Provinces. When the Ministry of Transport was created in 2012, SOFSE took over all the urban services not granted in concession of Greater Buenos Aires. The society also began to operate interurban services such as train services to Córdoba, Tucumán cities and other services previously operated by the Government of Entre Ríos Province.

In June 2013, SOFSE took over the Tren de la Costa when the Government decided the company would be managed by the Argentine State after revoking the contract with Sociedad Comercial del Plata.

In September 2013, the Government of Argentina designed SOFSE to operate the Mitre and Sarmiento lines, after their contracts of concession were revoked to Trenes de Buenos Aires. This decision was officially promulgated through Resolution N° 1083/13.

SOFSE temporarily operated the Mitre line until the Government of Argentina re-privatised it, giving the line concession to "Corredores Ferroviarios S.A." (a private company part of Emepa Group) on February 12, 2014.

In December 2014, brand new trains acquired by the Government of Argentina from Chinese company CNR Dalian, started to run luxury services from Constitución to Mar del Plata. The classic service continued to be operated by Ferrobaires.

In February 2015, services from Buenos Aires to Rufino, Santa Fe were reestablished after 22 years. The service runs with brand-new trains acquired from China on Ferrocarril San Martín tracks. Trains make stops at Chacabuco, Junín, Vedia and Alberdi, among other stations.

In March 2015, SOFSE started to run the CNR CKD8 trains from Retiro to Córdoba. This was more than twice the time that it took in 1938, when services operated by Central Argentine took 9 hours to connect both cities with two intermediate stops.

Commuter rail renationalisation 
SOFSE took over Belgrano Sur and Roca (operated by Argentren) and Mitre and San Martín (operated by Corredores Ferroviarios) lines after the Government of Argentina rescinded the contracts signed with both companies on March 2, 2015. The contract terms specified that the concession could be cancelled with no right to claim compensation. The agreements had been signed in February 2014, committing Argentren and Corredores Ferroviarios to operate the lines.

Current situation 
In January 2016, the Ministry of Transport ceased operations over services to La Pampa Province. The Government took the decision based on the low demand of the Santa Rosa–General Pico line and the poor conditions of some bridges that had deteriorated after the flooding in August 2015.

In June 2016, the Buenos Aires–Rosario service extended operations to Rosario Norte Station (located at the north of the city, closer to the downtown) instead of Rosario Sur, which had been terminus until then.

Services operated 
The following is a list of services operated by Operadora Ferroviaria in Argentina. The list includes urban railways such as Mitre, San Martín, Roca and Belgrano Sur lines previously managed by private companies. The Binational service Posadas-Encarnación is run by Casimiro Zbikoski S.A. through an operation agreement with SOFSE.

Metropolitan 
Commuter rail services within the Buenos Aires Province:

Long distance 
Inter-city services along Argentina, as of March 2023:

Notes

Maps of services operated 
As of February 2023

References

External links

 

Railway companies of Argentina
Railway companies established in 2008
Argentine brands